Patriarch Cyril of Alexandria may refer to:

 Cyril of Alexandria, ruled in 412–444
 Patriarch Cyril II of Alexandria, ruled in the 12th century
 Patriarch Cyril III of Alexandria, ruled in 1601–20